is a Japanese stage and film actress. She has appeared in 30 films since 1967. She starred in the 1974 film Sandakan No. 8, which was entered into the 25th Berlin International Film Festival. In 1975 she was a member of the jury at the 9th Moscow International Film Festival. In 1981 she was a member of the jury at the 12th Moscow International Film Festival.

Selected filmography

Film
 Tora-san's Grand Scheme (1970)
 The Wolves (1971)
 Inn of Evil (1971)
 Shinobu Kawa (1972)
 Long Journey into Love (1973)
 Sandakan No. 8 (1974)
 Moscow, My Love (1974), USSR-Japan co-production.
 The Fossil (1975)
 Melodies of a White Night (1976), USSR-Japan co-production.
 Air Crew (1979)
 Tora-san's Island Encounter (1985)
 A Step (1988), USSR-Japan co-production.
 Bell of Purity Temple (1992)
 Original (2009)
 Ware Yowakereba: Yajima Kajiko-den (2022)

Television
 Momi no Ki wa Nokotta (1970), Tayo
 Takechiyo to Haha (1970), Odai no Kata
 Shin Heike Monogatari (1972), Hōjō Masako
 Ōgon no Hibi (1978), Mio
 Sekigahara (1981), Hosokawa Gracia
 Ōoku (1983)
 Naotora: The Lady Warlord (2017), Odai no Kata

References

External links

1945 births
Living people
Japanese film actresses
People from Tokyo
Taiga drama lead actors
20th-century Japanese actresses
21st-century Japanese actresses